Oleh Volodymyrovych Ostapenko (born 27 October 1977 in Vinnytsia, Ukrainian SSR) is a professional Ukrainian football coach and a former goalkeeper.

Career
He worked a goalkeeping coach at Volyn Lutsk.

Personal life
Ostapenko is the father of the current Ukrainian defender Oleh Ostapenko.

References

External links
 
Official Website Profile
Profile on Football Squads

1977 births
Footballers from Vinnytsia
Living people
Ukrainian footballers
FC Podillya Khmelnytskyi players
FC Ros Bila Tserkva players
FC Nyva Bershad players
FC Kryvbas Kryvyi Rih players
FC Nyva Vinnytsia players
FC Fakel Voronezh players
Ukrainian expatriate footballers
Expatriate footballers in Russia
Ukrainian expatriate sportspeople in Russia
Russian Premier League players
FC Metalist Kharkiv players
Shamakhi FK players
Expatriate footballers in Azerbaijan
Ukrainian expatriate sportspeople in Azerbaijan
FC Vorskla Poltava players
FC Urartu players
Expatriate footballers in Armenia
Ukrainian expatriate sportspeople in Armenia
Armenian Premier League players
FC Mariupol players
FC Obolon-Brovar Kyiv players
Association football goalkeepers
Ukrainian football managers
FC Nyva Vinnytsia managers